Portland High School is a public secondary school in Portland, Michigan, United States. It serves grades 9-12 for the Portland Public School District.

The school was originally founded in 1881. The current building used was built in 1991.

Demographics
The demographic breakdown of the 671 students enrolled for the 2018–19 school year was:
Male - 51.4%
Female - 48.6%
Asian - 0.4%
Black - 0.3%
Hispanic - 3.0%
Native Hawaiian/Pacific islander - 0.1%
White - 95.3%
Multiracial - 0.9%
28.9% of the students were eligible for free or reduced-cost lunch. For 2018-19 Portland was a Title I school.

References

External links

Public high schools in Michigan
Schools in Ionia County, Michigan
1881 establishments in Michigan